This is a list of the Canadian musical artists named Entertainer of the Year at the Juno Awards in those years in which this award or its nearest equivalent was awarded.

Winners

Canadian Entertainer of the Year (1987)
1987 - Bryan Adams

Canadian Entertainer of the Year (1989 - 1994)
1989 - Glass Tiger
1990 - The Jeff Healey Band
1991 - The Tragically Hip
1992 - Bryan Adams
1993 - The Tragically Hip
1994 - The Rankin Family

Entertainer of the Year (1995)
1995 - The Tragically Hip

Levi's Entertainer of the Year (1996)
1996 - Shania Twain

References

Entertainer